James Brian Jacques (as in "Jakes"; 15 June 1939 – 5 February 2011) was an English novelist known for his Redwall series of novels and Castaways of the Flying Dutchman series. He also completed two collections of short stories entitled The Ribbajack & Other Curious Yarns and Seven Strange and Ghostly Tales.

Early years
Brian Jacques was born in Liverpool on 15 June 1939. His parents were James Alfred Jacques, a haulage contractor, and Ellen Ryan.

Jacques grew up in Kirkdale near to the Liverpool Docks. He was known by his middle name, Brian, because his father and a brother were also named James. His father loved literature and read his boys adventure stories by Daniel Defoe, Sir Thomas Mallory, Sir Arthur Conan Doyle, Robert Louis Stevenson, and Edgar Rice Burroughs, but also The Wind in the Willows with its cast of animals.  Jacques showed early writing talent. At age ten, assigned to write an animal story, he wrote about a bird that cleaned a crocodile's teeth. His teacher could not believe that a ten-year-old wrote it, and caned the boy for refusing to admit copying the story. He had always loved to write, but only then did he realize the extent of his abilities.  He attended St John's School until age fifteen, when he left school (as was usual at the time) and set out to find adventure as a merchant sailor. His book Redwall was written for his "special friends", the children of the Royal Wavertree School for the Blind, whom he first met while working as a milkman. He began to spend time with the children, reading books to them. However, he became dissatisfied with the state of children's literature, with too much adolescent angst and not enough magic, and eventually began to write stories for them. He is known for the very descriptive style of his novels, which emphasize sound, smell, taste, gravity, balance, temperature, touch, and kinesthetics, not just visual sensations.

Career 
His work gained acclaim when Alan Durband, his former English teacher (who also taught The Beatles members Paul McCartney and George Harrison), showed it to his (Durband's) own publisher without telling Jacques. Durband told his publishers: "This is the finest children's tale I've ever read, and you'd be foolish not to publish it". Soon after, Jacques was summoned to London to meet with the publishers, who gave him a contract to write the next five books in the series.

Redwall was an 800-page handwritten manuscript. It is now common for children's books to have 350 pages, and the Harry Potter books far exceed that, but in those days 200 was regarded as the maximum that would hold a child's attention. It set the tone for the whole series, centered on the triumph of good over evil, with peaceful mice, badgers, voles, hares, moles and squirrels defeating rats, weasels, ferrets, snakes and stoats. He did not shy away from the reality of battle, and many of the "good" creatures die.  
Redwall alludes to the surrounding human civilization, for example with a scene featuring a horse-drawn cart. The subsequent books ignore humans completely, portraying an Iron Age society from the misty past building castles, bridges and ships to the scale of forest creatures, writing their own literature and drawing their own maps. Jacques was highly involved in the audio books of his work, even enlisting his sons and others to voice Redwall inhabitants. Jacques said that the characters in his stories are based on people he has encountered. He based Gonff, the self-proclaimed "Prince of Mousethieves", on himself when he was a young boy hanging around the docks of Liverpool. Mariel is based on his granddaughter. Constance the Badgermum is based on his maternal grandmother. Other characters are a combination of many of the people he has met in his travels.

Jacques remembered well the rationing during and after the war, when he fantasized about the dishes in his aunt's illustrated Victorian cookbook. Groaning boards spread with sumptuous feasts are common scenes in his stories, described in mouth-watering detail. The war also informed his depictions of gruesome battles.  Jacques was known to prefer old-fashioned ways; he always preferred an old typewriter as being more reliable than a computer, and he was known to be not fond of videogames and other modern technology, though he allowed an animated television series to be produced, which aired on PBS in the United States. In the series, he introduced himself at the beginning of each episode and answered children's questions after the end of the cartoon ended, though the British Teletoon airings omitted the Q&A session. He never felt that he fit the image of a "writer sitting in his garden." Nonetheless, he was deeply touched by his success at reaching children. He was also pleased to be recognized by the people of Liverpool.  His novels have sold more than twenty million copies worldwide and have been published in twenty-eight languages.

Other interests 
Jacques also had musical interests. In the 1960s he formed a folk music band, the Liverpool Fishermen, with two of his brothers. He hosted a radio show called Jakestown on BBC Radio Merseyside from 1986 to 2006, featuring selections from his favourite operas.

Recognition 
In June 2005, he was awarded an Honorary Doctorate of Letters by the University of Liverpool. A prize was created at Bristol Grammar School, known as the 'Brian Jacques Award for Most Improved Creative Writing', and is awarded to a student in Year 8, as book tokens.

Family 
He lived with his wife, Maureen, in Liverpool. Jacques and his wife had two sons, now adults, David and Marc, and grandchildren Hannah and Anthony. Marc is a joiner and bricklayer, while David is a muralist and professor of art.

Death 
In 2011, Jacques was admitted to the Royal Liverpool Hospital to undergo emergency surgery for an aortic aneurysm. He died from a heart attack on 5 February 2011.

Books

Redwall series
 Redwall (1986)
 Mossflower (1988)
 Mattimeo (1989)
 Mariel of Redwall (1991)
 Salamandastron (1992)
 Martin the Warrior (1993)
 The Bellmaker (1994)
 Outcast of Redwall (1995)
 The Pearls of Lutra (1996)
 The Long Patrol (1997)
 Marlfox (1998)
 The Legend of Luke (1999)
 Lord Brocktree (2000)
 The Taggerung (2001)
 Triss (2002)
 Loamhedge (2003)
 Rakkety Tam (2004)
 High Rhulain (2005)
 Eulalia! (2007)
 Doomwyte (2008)
 The Sable Quean (2010)
 The Rogue Crew (2011) (posthumous)

Tribes of Redwall series
 Tribes of Redwall Badgers (2001)
 Tribes of Redwall Otters (2001)
 Tribes of Redwall Mice (2003)
 Tribes of Redwall Squirrels (Unreleased)
 Tribes of Redwall Hares (Unreleased)

Miscellaneous Redwall books
 The Great Redwall Feast (1996)
 Redwall Map & Riddler (1997)
 Redwall Friend & Foe (2000)
 A Redwall Winter's Tale (2003)
 The Redwall Cookbook (2005)

Castaways of the Flying Dutchman series
 Castaways of the Flying Dutchman (2001)
 The Angel's Command (2003)
 Voyage of Slaves (2006)

Urso Brunov 

 The Tale of Urso Brunov: Little Father of All Bears (2003)
 Urso Brunov and the White Emperor (2008)

Other works
 Seven Strange and Ghostly Tales (1991)
 The Ribbajack & Other Curious Yarns (2004)
"Get Yer Wack", Anvil Press, 1971
"YENNOWORRAMEANLIKE" , Raven Books, 1972
"According to Jacques - A Mersey Bible" , Raven Books, 1975
"Jakestown, My Liverpool" , Raven Books, 1979

References

External links

 
 Redwall Wiki – collaborative Redwall information and news resource
 
 

1939 births
2011 deaths
20th-century British writers
BBC radio presenters
British children's writers
British fantasy writers
British Merchant Navy personnel
English male novelists
English people of Irish descent
Novelists from Liverpool
Redwall